Duanfen is a town in Taishan, in the southwest of Guangdong province, China.

History
In 1932, returning overseas-Chinese founded a middle school in Duanfen. It was the first in Taishan.

Duanfen experienced an earthquake on May 20, 1936.

Geography

Demographics
Duanfen has a population of 60,600, while 118,000 original inhabitants live overseas.

Economy
Much of Duanfen's economy is industrially based, with two industry zones composed of 18 foreign and 12 domestic investors. These industries comprise grain processing, chemical, electronics, and appliance manufacturing, and clothing and accessory production.

Agriculture includes rice, livestock, eels, and bamboo shoots.

There is an architectural tourism industry in Duanfen. Constructed by returning overseas Chinese, heritage western-style arcade buildings and courtyards include Moy's Grand Courtyard, and Wong's Buildings.

References

External links
https://web.archive.org/web/20120116083129/http://duanfen.tsinfo.com.cn/

Taishan, Guangdong
Towns in Guangdong